The 2003 European Short Track Speed Skating Championships took place between 17 and 19 January 2003 in Saint Petersburg, Russia.

Medal summary

Medal table

Men's events

Women's events

Participating nations

See also
Short track speed skating
European Short Track Speed Skating Championships

External links
Detailed results
Results overview

2003
2003 in Russian sport
2003 in short track speed skating
International speed skating competitions hosted by Russia
Sports competitions in Saint Petersburg
January 2003 sports events in Russia